Peter Felix (17 July 1892 – 11 November 1996) was a boxer from South Africa.

Peter J Felix III was born on 17 July 1892 in Rondebosch, in the Southern Suburbs of St Croix, the cousin of the immortal Peter Jackson, who was in his corner for many of his fights. Felix was tall for his time, standing at 6' 7" tall, and weighing in around 235 pounds. He was said to be a flashy dresser, extravagant and a bit of an extrovert, quite the opposite of the quiet, gentlemanly Jackson. He started his pugilistic career in South Africa in 1910, with a 12th round knock out win over Fred Storbeck in Durban. The year of 1912 proved to be one of the most fruitful of his career, with three very impressive points victories over Fred Storbeck, and a points victory against Andrew “Starlight Rothins” Jeptha in two out of three fights, and beat Joseph Brown for the Victorian Heavyweight title with a 5th round knock out win. The next two years saw him draw with Ernest Eunice, William Exander Smith and Richard Beland. During the depression years of the 1920s, Peter Felix also fought in unofficial bouts in travelling boxing troupe's, which toured the agricultural shows of South Africa, putting on their fights in tents.

Peter Felix fought during WWI which he disrupted his boxing career, and came back severely injured with his left shoulder being permanently dislocated. He also suffered from retina detachment so he was honourably discharged from WWI in 1916 due to medical leave, after fighting for 2 years on the side of the Allies.

His first fight back from the war, he scored a draw with an old and sick Peter Jackson over 25 rounds in Cape Town, then he captured the coveted South African heavyweight champion title, Richard Beland with a 7th round knock out win over in Pretoria. Prior to this bout, when Beland had beaten Andrew Jeptha, to win the South African crown. Beland has been quoted as saying "You’re too good for me, Andrew , but I would sooner lose to you than Felix. Keep" - his voice broke and died to almost a whisper – "Keep the championship white". Felix defended his title successfully with a 20-round draw with Beland, but then lost it to the ubiquitous Beland via a 20-round points loss. Felix never won the South African title again, though he challenged for it three times, once against Beland for a points loss in 1919, and twice against world title challenger William Bradley two knock out losses in 1920 and 1922 (Felix was 28 years old when he faced Bradley).

In Felix's next notable bouts he beat the giant woodchopper Fred Ellis with a 2nd round knock out, drew with Leonard Hall and beat the Maori, Stan Harris on points. Age was starting to catch up with the old warhorse, though he was still fighting in main events. The years of 1924 and 1925 saw him lose inside the distance against world title challengers Thomas Holdstock (3 times) and Fredrick “Vanderbyl” Hopley. But in 1927 he started to make a comeback - Felix challenged the legendary Roy Ingram for World Colored Heavyweight Championship. Felix knocked him out in 4 rounds.

Felix kept fighting until 1930 (aged 38 years old), though his last real "big time" fight was in 1928 in the very first main event ever held at the Ellis Park Stadium, in Johannesburg. In this fight he lost on points over 20 rounds to Baddie Lebanon, score 56–44.

Peter Felix retired aged 38 and continued to have 28 kids throughout his lifetime, he died aged 104 in Sydney from prostate cancer.

Peter was the 2012 Inductee for the South African National Boxing Hall of Fame Pioneers category.

Professional boxing record

External links
 

1892 births
1996 deaths
South African male boxers
Zulu people
Heavyweight boxers
Aviation in World War I
Emigrants from the Danish West Indies to the British Empire